Petr Hruška (born 30 August 1971 in Uherské Hradiště) is a Czechoslovak-Czech sprint canoeist who competed in the early to mid-1990s. Competing in two Summer Olympics, he earned is best finish of seventh in the K-2 1000 m event for Czechoslovakia at Barcelona in 1992.

References
 Sports-Reference.com profile

1971 births
Canoeists at the 1992 Summer Olympics
Canoeists at the 1996 Summer Olympics
Czech male canoeists
Czechoslovak male canoeists
Living people
Olympic canoeists of Czechoslovakia
Olympic canoeists of the Czech Republic